Hussein ibn Nasser Sharif  (30 November 1902 – 1 May 1982) was a Jordanian politician and statesman who served as the 16th Prime Minister of Jordan from 1963 to 1964, and again in 1967. He previously served ambassador to Spain and Turkey.

Career
 From 1929 to 1935 he was attached to the Royal Cabinet in Baghdad.
 From 1935 to 1937 he was Attaché at the Iraqi Legation to Turkey.
 From 1938 to 1942 he was Assistant Head of Royal Protocol in Baghdad.
 From 1944 to 1946 he was Assistant Head of Royal Protocol in Baghdad.
 From 1946 to 1948 he was Iraqi Consul-General in Jerusalem and Chargé d'affaires in Amman, (Jordan)
 From 1949 to 1950 he was Jordanian Minister Plenipotentiary to Turkey.
 From 1950 to 1951 he was Minister at the Legations to France and Spain.
 From  to  he was ambassador in Madrid.
 In 1961 he became Chief of the Royal Cabinet.
 In April 1963 Hussein of Jordan used his constitutional prerogatives, dissolved the Parliament, ordered his uncle Sharif Hussein ibn Nasser to form a government and curb Freedom of assembly of supporters of Gamal Abdel Nasser with Police, army and Bedouin contingents.
 From   to  he was Prime Minister of Jordan.
 From   to  he occupied again the position of Prime Minister of Jordan.
 In 1969 he was appointed member of the Senate.

Honour

Foreign honour
  : Honorary Grand Commander of the Order of the Defender of the Realm (S.M.N.) (1965)

References

1902 births
1982 deaths
Ambassadors of Jordan to Turkey
Ambassadors of Jordan to Spain
Prime Ministers of Jordan
Knights Grand Cross of the Royal Victorian Order
Members of the Senate of Jordan